Safford Regional Airport  is in Graham County, Arizona, United States,  east of Safford, which owns it.  The FAA's National Plan of Integrated Airport Systems for 2009–2013 categorizes it as a general aviation facility. It is the only paved airport in Graham County.

History 
Safford Regional Airport as we know it was built as a military auxiliary field during World War II. On November 11, 1941, a 20-year lease for the airport site was given to the City of Safford by the U.S. Government. By March 8, 1946, the airport site was transferred to the City of Safford permanently.

 1949: Land acquisition, construction of access road and cattle guard, fencing.
 1950: Installation of medium intensity runway lighting (MIRL) on NE/SW runway, modification of lighting service and control segmented circle and lighted wind cone, construction of curbs for auto parking, fencing. Installation of  clear- green rotating beacon.
 1952: Construction of water supply and distribution system, convert single phase electrical system to 3 phase.
 1981: Installation of MIRL; 12/30. Construction of parking apron.
Grading, drainage and surfacing of taxiway 12/30.
 1986: Slurry sealing of runway 12/30.
 1992: Extension of taxiway B to runway 12/30 eastern end, crack seal and overlay existing taxiway A and B, install MITL along Taxiway C and extend taxiway B.
 1994: Reconstruction of runway 12/30 excluding recent extension and construction of terminal parking lot. 
 1995: Paving of auto parking lot.
 1996: Reconstruction and expansion of existing terminal apron.
 1997: ASOS Weather Station installed.
 1998: Construction of heliport, providing of runway 8/26 pavement and airport fencing.

Airline service history
The original Frontier Airlines began service to Safford in 1950 with Douglas DC-3 aircraft. Safford was a stop on a route between Phoenix and El Paso which also made stops at Globe/Miami and Clifton/Morenci, Arizona as well as at Lordsburg, Deming, and Las Cruces, New Mexico. By 1956 the route was redirected from Phoenix to Albuquerque stopping in Tucson, Safford, Clifton, and Silver City in New Mexico. Frontier's service ended in 1964. The airport was served again briefly in 1974 and 1975 by Cochise Airlines with flights to Tucson and Phoenix using a Cessna 402 aircraft.

Facilities
It has two asphalt runways: 12/30 is 6,006 by 100 feet (1,831 x 30 m) and 8/26 is 4,800 by 75 feet (1,463 x 23 m). It has one concrete helipad, H1, 72 by 72 ft (22 x 22 m).

In the year ending March 31, 2009 the airport had 8,690 aircraft operations, average 23 per day: 93% general aviation, 7% military and <1% air taxi. 32 aircraft were then based at this airport: 56% single-engine, 41% multi-engine and 3% helicopter.

References

External links 
 Ponderosa Aviation, the fixed-base operator (FBO)
 Safford Regional Airport (SAD) at Arizona DOT airport directory
 Aerial image as of 15 May 1998 from USGS The National Map
 

Airports in Graham County, Arizona
Safford, Arizona